Hasllibacter is a Gram-negative and aerobic  genus of bacteria from the family of Rhodobacteraceae with one known species (Hasllibacter halocynthiae). Hasllibacter halocynthiae has been isolated from a Sea pineapple from Gangneung in Korea.

References

Rhodobacteraceae
Bacteria genera
Monotypic bacteria genera